Ilya Rybinski (born August 3, 1993) is a Belarusian male acrobatic gymnast. With Yauheni Novikau, he achieved silver in the 2014 Acrobatic Gymnastics World Championships.

References

External links

 

1993 births
Living people
Belarusian acrobatic gymnasts
Male acrobatic gymnasts
Medalists at the Acrobatic Gymnastics World Championships